David Smith (27 November 1962 – 18 May 2002) was an English professional wrestler. Born in Golborne, Lancashire, Smith is best known for his appearances in the United States with the then World Wrestling Federation and now World Wrestling Entertainment under the ring names Davey Boy Smith and The British Bulldog. He was trained by Ted Betley in Winwick, England before relocating to Calgary, Alberta, Canada to further his training under Stu Hart. While training with Hart, Smith met Stu and Helen Hart's youngest daughter Diana, whom he married on 7 October 1984. Their son Harry is also an accomplished professional wrestler who wrestled and won tag-team gold in WWE NJPW, Pro Wrestling NOAH,

Smith won titles within the WWE in three decades, from the 1980s to the 2000s. He headlined multiple pay-per-view events for the WWF and WCW, which included matches for the WWF and WCW world heavyweight championships. Smith also defeated his real-life brother-in-law Bret Hart for the WWF Intercontinental Championship in the main event of SummerSlam 1992 at London's Wembley Stadium, in front of an alleged 80,355 fans. Hart considers this to be his best match.

He was the inaugural WWF European Champion and holds the records for longest single reign (206 days) and total days as champion (253); he also held the title on the sole occasion where a match for that championship headlined a pay-per-view event, at One Night Only in 1997. Prior to finding singles success, Smith achieved stardom as one half of The British Bulldogs tag team, alongside his cousin Dynamite Kid. Smith was inducted into the 2020 WWE Hall of Fame.

Early life
Smith was born in Golborne, where he grew up with his father Sid, mother Joyce, his brother, Terrence and sisters, Joanne and Tracy. Joyce's nephew was Tom Billington, also known as the Dynamite Kid, who was Smith's frequent tag-team partner. Smith had partial Italian ancestry.

Professional wrestling career

Early career (1978–1984) 
Smith started competing on ITV's World of Sport when he was only 15, wrestling under the name Young David with his slightly older cousin the Dynamite Kid Tom Billington. Mentored by Billington's friend Alan Dennison, in 1979 Smith appeared to have won the British Welterweight championship from Jim Breaks only for the win to be disallowed due to Dennison distracting Breaks. Smith then held Breaks to a 1–1 draw, as a result of which Dennison himself challenged and defeated Breaks for the belt. Smith was then spotted by Bruce Hart, who was scouting talent in the UK, and both he and Billington travelled to Canada to wrestle for Stu Hart. Hart and Roy Wood trained Smith further in Hart's "Dungeon" and Smith became a key wrestler in Hart's Stampede Wrestling. During his time in Stampede, Smith began a feud with the Dynamite Kid, and on 9 July 1982, he [Smith] won his first title when he defeated the Dynamite Kid for the Stampede British Commonwealth Mid-Heavyweight title. In 1983, Smith debuted in New Japan Pro-Wrestling where he became involved in a three-way feud with Dynamite Kid and The Cobra (George Takano) over the NWA Junior Heavyweight Title. On 7 February 1984, a three-way, one-night tournament was held, and Dynamite Kid won the tournament by defeating Smith via count-out, and the Cobra by pinfall. After the tournament, Smith and Dynamite Kid formed a tag team in both New Japan and in Stampede Wrestling known as the British Bulldogs. In 1984, the Bulldogs made a shocking move by jumping to New Japan's rival, All Japan Pro Wrestling just before the start of All Japan's annual Tag Team tournament. The Bulldogs' performance in this tournament drew the interest of the World Wrestling Federation.

World Wrestling Federation (1984–1988) 

The Bulldogs, along with Smith's brothers-in-law Bret Hart and Jim Neidhart were brought in to the World Wrestling Federation (WWF) after Vince McMahon bought out Stampede Wrestling. At first, the Bulldogs were able to tour both WWE and All Japan, but eventually McMahon gained exclusive rights to the Bulldogs. While in the WWE, the Bulldogs began a long running feud with Hart and Neidhart, who were now known as The Hart Foundation. The Bulldogs also feuded with the Dream Team (Greg Valentine and Brutus Beefcake). At WrestleMania 2, with Lou Albano and Ozzy Osbourne in their corner, the Bulldogs defeated the Dream Team for the Tag Team Championship. The Bulldogs held the titles for nearly nine months, feuding with the Dream Team and Nikolai Volkoff and The Iron Sheik, but the Hart Foundation bested the Bulldogs to win the titles on a January 1987 episode of Superstars. After losing the titles, the Bulldogs gained a mascot, an actual bulldog who went by the name Matilda, and feuded with the likes of The Islanders (who in kayfabe dog-napped Matilda), Demolition, and the Rougeau Brothers.

The Bulldogs left the WWE in 1988, in part due to backstage problems, specifically between the Dynamite Kid and the Rougeau Brothers. The Bulldogs had allegedly pulled a number of ribs (pranks) on the Rougeaus. Curt Hennig also pranked the duo, who, assuming that the Bulldogs were behind that prank as well, retaliated: Jacques Rougeau knocked out four of Dynamite Kid's teeth with a fist filled with a roll of quarters. Though there are various accounts of this situation, many suggest that Billington drew first blood by bullying Rougeau (among many others including The Honky Tonk Man, whom Dynamite brought to tears) in Miami. No disciplinary action was taken against Jacques. Billington shortly afterwards quit the WWE over a dispute with WWE management over the issuance of complimentary plane tickets, over which he resigned from the company, and Smith followed suit.

Stampede Wrestling; All Japan Pro Wrestling (1988–1990) 
After leaving the WWE, the Bulldogs returned to Stampede Wrestling, and also to All Japan Pro Wrestling. Stampede officials were hopeful that the return of the Bulldogs would revive a struggling promotion, but they were unsuccessful. Eventually in May 1989, the decision was made to split up the Bulldogs, which caused some problems with All Japan owner Shohei Baba, who was still promoting the Bulldogs as a tag team. On 4 July 1989 Smith, along with fellow wrestlers Chris Benoit, Ross Hart, and Jason the Terrible, was involved in a serious automobile accident. Smith, who was not wearing a seatbelt at the time, needed 135 stitches after slamming his head through the windshield and being thrown 25 feet onto the pavement. He recovered, and the Bulldogs continued teaming in All Japan against teams such as Joe and Dean Malenko, Kenta Kobashi and Tsuyoshi Kikuchi, and The Nasty Boys. Personal problems began to surface between Smith and Billington, and Smith later left All Japan to return to the WWF.

World Wrestling Federation (1990–1992)

British sensation (1990–1992) 
Smith returned to the WWF in 1990, where he was pushed as the same character from the British Bulldogs' original WWF run, but this time as a singles star under the name "The British Bulldog", which he had trademarked during his earlier tag team run in the WWF, thus preventing his former partner Dynamite Kid from using the name. Smith returned to the WWF at a live event on 6 October, where he defeated Haku. Smith made his televised in-ring return on 27 October episode of Superstars, where he defeated the Brooklyn Brawler. Over the next two years, Smith was a mid-carder, feuding with the likes of The Warlord and Mr. Perfect. He was a fairly popular performer in the United States, but was a huge attraction to fans in the United Kingdom, due in part to the WWF becoming a ratings hit on Sky Sports, as well as the promotion touring the country holding supercards such as UK Rampage which saw Smith defeat The Berzerker at the London Arena in March 1991 and the Battle Royal at the Albert Hall in which Smith won a 20-man battle royal by eliminating Typhoon on 3 October 1991. After entering as the first man in the 1992 Royal Rumble, he eliminated Ted DiBiase, Jerry Sags and Haku before being eliminated by the eventual winner Ric Flair. Smith again headlined the WWF's European tours at European Rampage again winning a 15-man battle royal by eliminating The Mountie in München, Germany on 14 April 1992 and defeated Irwin R. Schyster in Sheffield, England on 19 April 1992.

Intercontinental Champion (1992) 
In 1992, due to Smith's newfound popularity in the United Kingdom, the WWF decided to hold its annual SummerSlam pay-per-view in Wembley Stadium in London. The show was main-evented by Smith (led to the ring by the then British, Commonwealth & European Heavyweight Boxing champion Lennox Lewis) and Bret Hart in a match for Hart's Intercontinental Championship. On 29 August at SummerSlam, in front of 80,355 of his homeland fans, Smith won the title in a match which is regarded by many wrestling experts as the finest in his career. Originally, the WWF was going to have Hart drop the title to Shawn Michaels prior to SummerSlam, but when the company decided to hold the pay-per-view in London, they had Smith win the title from Hart there. Smith lost the title to Michaels on 14 November Saturday Night's Main Event XXXI and was later released by the WWF. According to Bret Hart's book, the reason for Smith's release was that he and The Ultimate Warrior were receiving shipments of Human Growth Hormone from a pharmacy in England. Warrior was released as well.

Various promotions (1992–1994)
Shortly after leaving the World Wrestling Federation, Smith debuted in Eastern Championship Wrestling in December 1992, defeating Jimmy Snuka. The following month, at Battle of the Belts, he defeated The Masked Superstar.

In February 1993, Smith debuted in World Championship Wrestling, defeating Rex Cooper on an episode of WCW WorldWide. At SuperBrawl III later that month, he defeated Bill Irwin. Over the following weeks, he scored a series of wins on WCW WorldWide, WCW Main Event, and WCW Saturday Night, defeating a series of jobbers. In March 1993, he wrestled a series of matches against Rick Rude.

In late-March 1993, Smith returned to All Japan Pro Wrestling for its Champion Carnival tournament. He scored a total of six points, defeating Danny Kroffat, Doug Furnas, and Johnny Ace but losing to Akira Taue, Kenta Kobashi, Mitsuharu Misawa, The Patriot, Stan Hansen, Steve Williams, Terry Gordy, and Toshiaki Kawada.

Upon returning from Japan in May 1993, Smith formed an alliance with top protagonist Sting, and engaging in feuds with top antagonists Sid Vicious and Big Van Vader. Smith wrestled World Heavyweight Champion Vader, on a number of occasions including the main events at Slamboree and Clash of the Champions XXIV. The feud culminated when Smith seemingly won the WCW World Heavyweight Championship from Vader on a tour of England in October 1993, though the decision was reversed. In July 1993, Smith was reportedly involved in an altercation with a man at a bar who was making advances towards his wife. As a result of the ensuing legal issues that followed, WCW released Smith from his contract in December 1993. His final pay-per-view appearance for WCW during this period came at the November 1993 Battlebowl pay-per-view the month prior, where he was teamed with Kole in the first round of the Lethal Lottery; they lost to Road Warrior Hawk and Rip Rogers.

In January 1994, Smith returned home to the United Kingdom and wrestled for All Star Wrestling. He was brought into the company by Max Crabtree to be his next top star after Big Daddy retired in December 1993 after suffering a stroke. During his time in ASW, Smith wrestled the likes of Jimmy Ocean, Ricky Knight, Drew McDonald, Karl Krammer, Kamikazi, Black Bart, Johnny Angel, Dale Preston, and Iron Duke Lynch, while primarily teaming with Tony Stewart. By August 1994, he left ASW to return to the WWF.

World Wrestling Federation (1994–1997)

Allied Powers (1994–1995)

Smith returned to the WWF at SummerSlam in 1994, where he immediately became involved in an ongoing family feud between Bret Hart and his brother, Owen Hart. Smith then teamed up with Bret against Owen and Jim Neidhart in a series of tag team matches, most notably in a victory on Monday Night Raw. Smith appeared at Survivor Series in a 10-man elimination match. His partners were Intercontinental Champion Razor Ramon, 1-2-3 Kid, and The Headshrinkers. They faced WWF Tag Team Champions Shawn Michaels and Diesel, Owen Hart, Jeff Jarrett, and Jim Neidhart. Smith was eventually counted out. Smith again played a key part in the match at Survivor Series featuring his brothers-in-law Bret and Owen Hart, in which he supported Bret against Owen's benefactor; Bob Backlund. Smith would be knocked unconscious by Owen, allowing Owen to take advantage of his brother's situation. Owen manipulated Bret's mother to surrender to Backlund on Bret's behalf, thus costing Bret to lose the match and the WWF Championship. Two days later Smith would win a WWF Championship match against Backlund by countout, just one day before Backlund would lose the WWF Championship to Diesel.

After entering the Royal Rumble as the second entrant in 1995, Smith and Shawn Michaels were the final two remaining participants at the end. Smith tossed Michaels over the ropes and celebrated on the second turnbuckle. However, only one of Michaels feet hit the floor and he was able to reenter the ring and eliminate Smith from behind. Soon after, Smith began teaming with Lex Luger as the Allied Powers. The team wasn't much of a success and only wrestled on two pay-per-views as a tag team. The first came at WrestleMania XI where they defeated The Blu Brothers. The second came at In Your House 2 where they failed to win the Tag Team Championship from Owen Hart and Yokozuna. Afterward the team briefly began feuding with Men on a Mission. On an August episode of Monday Night Raw, the Allied Powers were supposed to face Men on a Mission but Luger (kayfabe) no-showed the match; Smith found a replacement in the WWF Champion Diesel. During the match Smith unexpectedly attacked Diesel and turned heel for the first time in his WWF career, helping Men on a Mission beat up Diesel and aligning himself with Jim Cornette's stable with Owen Hart and Yokozuna, who had been his adversaries just a month earlier, thus disbanding the Allied Powers.

Camp Cornette, teaming with Owen Hart (1995–1997) 

At In Your House 4 in Winnipeg, Manitoba, Smith received a WWF Championship shot against Diesel. Smith won by disqualification after Bret Hart interfered. At the Survivor Series in Landover, Maryland, Smith participated in the Wild Card eight-man elimination match. He teamed with Shawn Michaels, Ahmed Johnson, and Sycho Sid. They faced WWF Intercontinental Champion Razor Ramon, Dean Douglas, Owen Hart, and Yokozuna. Smith, Michaels, and Johnson were the survivors. In December, at In Your House 5 from Hershey, Pennsylvania, Smith was granted a title shot against new WWF Champion Bret Hart in a rematch from their SummerSlam 1992 match. They had another critically acclaimed match yet Hart won this time. A notable incident from this match was that Hart bled during the match, which was controversial because WWF outlawed bleeding at the time. Smith entered the 1996 Royal Rumble where he made it to the final four before being eliminated by Shawn Michaels. At In Your House 6 he lost to Yokozuna by disqualification after Vader interfered. At WrestleMania XII he teamed with Vader and Owen Hart to defeat Yokozuna, Ahmed Johnson, and Jake Roberts. At In Your House 7 in April, Smith and (Owen) Hart defeated Johnson and Roberts after Smith forced Roberts to submit.

In 1996, after Shawn Michaels became WWF Champion, Smith was put in a feud with the new champion. The feud was supposedly based on Smith's wife, Diana, accusing Michaels of hitting on her, which angered Smith and made him determined to take the Title from Michaels. The two main-evented the In Your House 8: Beware of Dog pay-per-view, and their match ended in a draw, leading to a rematch at the 1996 King of the Ring pay-per-view. Michaels ended up successfully defending the title. Afterwards, Smith formed a tag team with his brother-in-law, Owen Hart, and the two soon won the WWF Tag Team Championship from The Smokin' Gunns. The team defended their titles against teams such as Doug Furnas and Phil LaFon, Vader and Mankind, and The Legion of Doom. In 1997, the WWF created the WWF European Championship, and Smith became the first ever holder of the title, winning a tournament which culminated in him defeating his own tag team partner, Owen Hart, in the finals on 26 February.

Hart Foundation (1997) 

Hart and Smith later joined forces with Bret Hart, Jim Neidhart, and Brian Pillman to form a new form of the Hart Foundation, a heel faction which feuded with Stone Cold Steve Austin and other American wrestlers. This created an interesting rift between American fans, where the Hart Foundation were vilified, and Canadian fans, who revered the Hart Foundation. Smith and Owen dropped the WWF Tag Team Championship to Austin and Michaels, and lost the final match in a tournament for the vacant WWF Tag Team Championship to Austin and Dude Love. Smith then started a feud with Ken Shamrock for the European Championship, and eventually lost the European Championship to Shawn Michaels at the British Pay-per-view event One Night Only. Smith was booked in the main event to defend the belt against Michaels. However, Michaels convinced Vince McMahon that he should win, as it would create build-up not only for his impending rematch with Bret Hart, but also for a rematch against Smith at the next British pay-per-view. Smith reluctantly agreed, and fans at the event, who gave Smith an ovation, voiced their displeasure by viciously booing Michaels and littering the ring with garbage. This marks the only time Smith lost on a WWF card in the United Kingdom. On 9 November at Survivor Series in Montreal, Smith was part of Team Canada (alongside Jim Neidhart, Doug Furnas and Philip Lafon), defeating Team USA (Vader, Goldust, Marc Mero and the debuting Steve Blackman). The event became infamous for the "Montreal Screwjob", in which Vince McMahon manipulated the finish of Bret Hart's match and had him lose the WWF Championship to Michaels, despite Hart not submitting when placed in a Sharpshooter. Smith left the WWF for WCW, along with Bret Hart and Neidhart, soon afterward.

World Championship Wrestling (1997–1998)
Smith rejoined WCW in late 1997, and began a feud with Steve McMichael, who was complaining about all the wrestlers coming from "Up North". Smith and Neidhart later formed a tag team, but were only featured sparingly on WCW Thunder. They challenged for the World Tag Team Championship on several occasions, but failed to win the titles. He suffered a knee injury in April 1998 that sidelined him for a month. He suffered another, much more serious injury on 13 September 1998 at Fall Brawl during his match with Neidhart against The Dancing Fools, Disco Inferno and Alex Wright. During the match, while taking bumps, Smith twice landed awkwardly on a trapdoor that had been set up underneath the ring canvas to enable The Warrior to make a dramatic entrance in the night's main event. The result was a spinal infection that nearly paralysed Smith, hospitalising him for six months. While recuperating, Smith received a FedEx informing him that his WCW contract had been terminated. Following this serious back injury, Smith then battled an addiction to morphine and painkilling drugs.

World Wrestling Federation (1999–2000)
Smith returned to the WWF in September 1999. In keeping with the company's new "Attitude Era", Smith began wrestling in jeans instead of his usual Union Flag-adorned tights and his theme music was to a remix of his previous theme "Rule, Britannia!" and later to rock music (with the sounds of a dog barking as the song began). On the 9 of September episode of SmackDown! in Albany, New York, Smith defeated the Big Boss Man for the WWF Hardcore Championship. Smith forfeited the title later that evening, giving the belt back to Al Snow, because Boss Man had previously (kayfabe) dog-napped Snow's dog Pepper to win the title from him, and driving him insane in the process. Smith then began pursuing the WWF Championship, eventually turning heel and beginning a feud with The Rock. Smith headlined Unforgiven as part of a six-man WWF Championship Match that was won by Triple H. On 2 October Smith returned to England as a heel at Rebellion.

Smith defeated D'Lo Brown for the WWF European Championship on SmackDown! on 26 October. He lost the title to Val Venis in a triple threat match at Armageddon. On 6 May 2000 in London, Smith defeated Crash Holly for the Hardcore Championship. Holly regained the title from Smith in New Haven, Connecticut on 11 May episode of SmackDown!. Smith's last televised match with the WWF was on Sunday Night Heat, when he burst into Eddie Guerrero and Chyna's locker room, accusing Guerrero (who was the European Champion at the time) of not treating the belt with the respect it deserved. This led to a European Championship title match on that Heat, in which both men were disqualified. After Heat, WWF announced that Smith had again left the WWF on 15 May 2000. Smith was given a final chance to wrestle for WWE by Vince McMahon, performing at a 27 May Calgary house show against Steve Blackman, who ended the match very quickly. Smith showed up to a house show in Edmonton the following night, allegedly in worse condition than the night prior.  He was sent home from this show and released by the WWE shortly thereafter.

Late career (2000–2002)
Before his death on 18 May 2002, Smith had been training with the intent of resuming his career and came out of retirement wrestling in three tag-team matches with his son, Harry Smith the previous weekend in Manitoba, Canada.

Professional wrestling style and persona
Due to his training in Stu Hart's Dungeon, Smith was renowned for both his technical skill along with his power moves, frequently performing multiple gorilla press slam variations and a delayed vertical suplex, where he would often hold the opponent in the air for an extended length of time to emphasize his strength. His finishing manoeuvre was a Running powerslam.

Personal life
Some writers have claimed that Smith's middle name was actually "Boy", supposedly as the result of one of his parents mistaking the middle name field on Smith's birth certificate for the gender field. This story is undoubtedly apocryphal - not only was "Davey Boy" a common nickname in England during Smith's youth for boys named David, but British birth certificates are completed by a registrar for the General Register Office, not the child's parents, and do not have a middle name field.

Smith and his wife Diana had two children, Harry (born 2 August 1985 in Calgary) and Georgia (born 26 September 1987, also in Calgary). In early January 2000, Smith and Diana divorced, with Diana ultimately gaining custody of their son. Shortly after his release from the WWF in 2000, Smith entered an Atlanta drug rehabilitation clinic  to treat his addiction to prescription Opiate painkillers, including morphine, upon which he had become dependent following a 1998 back injury suffered while in WCW. 2000 would also see Smith arrested for allegedly threatening to kill Diana and her sister Ellie. This would not be Smith's last interaction with the law: following an altercation at "The Back Alley," a Calgary bar, Smith was charged with aggravated assault against 19-year-old wrestler Kody Light after a dispute regarding how Light had spoken to Diana.  The charges were later dropped. Andrea Redding, Smith's girlfriend from 2000 to his death, has stated that they were planning to get married shortly before his death.

Death
Smith died on 18 May 2002 after suffering a heart attack while on holiday in Invermere, British Columbia, with his girlfriend Andrea Redding, who was Bruce Hart's estranged wife. He was 39 years old. Forensic scientist Julie Evans stated that although she had found steroids and painkillers in Smith's system, they were not at a life-threatening level. She instead concluded that Smith had died from natural causes associated with an enlarged heart. Bruce Hart claimed "Davey paid the price with steroid cocktails and human-growth hormones." Two funeral services were held, one by Andrea and the other by the Hart family. Bret Hart attended both. He was buried in the All Saints Roman Catholic Churchyard cemetery in Greater Manchester, England.

Other media
Smith made his video game debut in WWF Super WrestleMania. He later appeared in numerous video games including WWF In Your House, WWF War Zone, Legends of Wrestling II, Showdown: Legends of Wrestling, WCW/nWo Revenge, WWF No Mercy, WWE SmackDown! vs. Raw 2006, WWE SmackDown vs. Raw 2011 (as DLC), WWE '13, WWE 2K16, WWE 2K17, WWE 2K18, WWE 2K19 and WWE 2K22. He also appears in the first two seasons of the WWE SuperCard mobile game as well as the WWE Champions mobile game.

Championships and accomplishments 
All Japan Pro Wrestling
2 January Korakuen Hall Heavyweight Battle Royal Winner in 1989
World's Strongest Tag Determination League Fighting Spirit Award (1984, 1985) – with Dynamite Kid
World's Strongest Tag Determination League Skills Award (1989) – with Dynamite Kid

Canadian Wrestling Hall of Fame
Individually
With the Hart family

Independent Wrestling Association
IWA Heavyweight Champion (1 time)

Pro Wrestling Illustrated
Match of the Year (1992) vs. Bret Hart at SummerSlam
Ranked No. 15 of the top 500 singles wrestlers in the PWI 500 in 1993
Ranked No. 53 of the top 500 singles wrestlers of the "PWI Years" in 2003
Ranked No. 5 and No. 84 of the top 100 tag teams of the "PWI Years" with the Dynamite Kid and Owen Hart, respectively, in 2003

Stampede Wrestling
Stampede International Tag Team Championship (2 times) – with Bruce Hart
Stampede British Commonwealth Mid-Heavyweight Championship (1 time)
Stampede Wrestling International Tag Team Championship (2 times) – with the Dynamite Kid
Stampede North American Heavyweight Championship (2 times)
Stampede World Mid-Heavyweight Championship (1 time)
Stampede Wrestling Hall of Fame (Class of 1995)

World Wide Wrestling Alliance
WWWA Intercontinental Champion (1 time)

Wrestling Observer Newsletter
Best Wrestling Maneuver (1984) Power clean dropkick
Feud of the Year (1997) with The Hart Foundation vs. Stone Cold Steve Austin
Most Unimproved (1991)
Tag Team of the Year (1985) with the Dynamite Kid

World Wrestling Federation
WWF European Championship (2 times, inaugural)
WWF Intercontinental Championship (1 time)
WWF Hardcore Championship (2 times)
WWF Tag Team Championship (2 times) – with the Dynamite Kid (1) and Owen Hart (1)
Battle Royal at the Albert Hall (1991)
WWF European Championship tournament (1997)
WWF World Tag Team Championship Tournament (1997) – with Owen Hart
WWE Hall of Fame (Class of 2020)

See also 

 Allied Powers
 British Bulldogs
 Hart Foundation
 John Hindley
 List of premature professional wrestling deaths

References
Citations

Bibliography

Further reading

External links 

 
 
 

1962 births
2002 deaths
20th-century professional wrestlers
21st-century professional wrestlers
Billington family
English people of Italian descent
English male professional wrestlers
Hart family members
People from Golborne
Sportspeople from Wigan]
Stampede Wrestling alumni
Stampede Wrestling British Commonwealth Mid-Heavyweight Champions
Stampede Wrestling International Tag Team Champions
Stampede Wrestling North American Heavyweight Champions
Stampede Wrestling World Mid-Heavyweight Champions
The Hart Foundation members
WWE Hall of Fame inductees
WWF European Champions
WWF/WWE Hardcore Champions
WWF/WWE Intercontinental Champions